African Judo Championships is a continental judo championship organized by the African Judo Union.

Tournaments

Statistics

All-time medal table 2001-2022

Notes and references

Notes

References

External links 
Judo Union
African Judo Union
 http://www.judoinside.com/judoka/statsgen
 http://www.judobase.org/

 
Judo competitions
Recurring sporting events established in 2001